The Black Swan is a public house in the city centre of York, in England.
The building lies on Peasholme Green, on the site of an important Mediaeval house which had been occupied by various Lord Mayors of York and Members of Parliament.  In 1560, Martin Bowes rebuilt the property, and in 1670 Henry Thompson made substantial alterations, rebuilding parts in brick, and altering the interior.  Early in the 18th-century, the house was owned by Edward Thompson.

In the late-18th century, the house was converted into a pub, although much of its interior survives intact from the 1670 alterations, particularly in the entrance hall, the Smoke Room, and a room upstairs with a trompe l'oeil painting.  Externally, the central section of the facade is timber-framed with a jettied first floor, dating from 1560.  To its right is a brick and timber extension from 1670, and to the left, an extension built in 1940, with a wing of 1670 behind.

By the 1930s, the pub was owned by the Tadcaster Tower brewery, which undertook a major renovation intended to preserve the building's historical character.  The pub later came into the ownership of Bass.  In 1954, it was grade II* listed.

One tradition claims that the Black Swan is linked to St Cuthbert's Church by an underground passage.  The pub is also said to be haunted by several ghosts.  Since 1978, it has hosted a folk music club, and since 2003, an annual folk festival.  In 2009, it was voted Folk Club of the Year at the BBC Radio 2 Folk Awards.

See also
The Swan, York, a pub on Bishopgate Street, York
Old White Swan, historic pub on Goodramgate, York

References

External links

Grade II* listed pubs in York
Grade II* listed houses
Houses completed in 1560
Houses in North Yorkshire
Timber framed buildings in Yorkshire
Timber framed pubs in England